Asura: The City of Madness is a 2016 South Korean action crime film directed by Kim Sung-su. The film revolves around Han Do-kyung, a shady cop, who becomes caught between internal affairs and the city's corrupt mayor. Starring Jung Woo-sung, Hwang Jung-min, Ju Ji-hoon and Kwak Do-won in the lead roles, it released theatrically on 28 September 2016 in South Korea.

Cast
 Jung Woo-sung as Han Do-kyung
 Hwang Jung-min as Park Sung-bae
 Ju Ji-hoon as Moon Seon-mo
 Kwak Do-won as Kim Cha-in
 Jung Man-sik as Do Chang-hak
 Yoon Ji-hye as Cha Seung-mi
 Kim Hae-gon as Tae Byung-jo
 Oh Yeon-ah as Jung Yoon-hee
 Kim Soo-jin as Female councilor
 Kim Won-hae
Kim Jong-soo
Mahbub Alam - Bangladeshi worker

Awards and nominations

References

External links 
 
 
 

2016 films
2016 crime action films
2010s Korean-language films
Film noir
Films about police officers
Films about corruption
CJ Entertainment films
South Korean crime action films
South Korean neo-noir films
2010s South Korean films